Neqarechi Mahalleh or Naqqarchi Mahalleh, also rendered as Neqarehchi Mahalleh, may refer to:
 Neqarechi Mahalleh, Babol
 Naqqarchi Mahalleh, Sari